Shackleton is an English surname, and may refer to:

 Ernest Shackleton (1874–1922), Irish Antarctic explorer
 Alan Shackleton (1934–2009), English footballer
 David Shackleton (1863–1938), British cotton worker and trade unionist
 David John Shackleton (born 1948), Vice Admiral of the Royal Australian Navy
 Derek Shackleton (1924–2007), English cricketer
 Edward Shackleton, Baron Shackleton (1911–1994), British geographer and Labour Party politician
 Fiona Shackleton (born 1956), English lawyer
 Greg Shackleton (1946–1975), Australian journalist, member of the Balibo Five
 Jamie Shackleton (born 1999), English footballer
 Janet Shackleton, New Zealand hurdler
 John Shackleton (died 1767), British painter and draughtsman
 Julian Shackleton (born 1952), English cricketer
 Keith Shackleton (1923–2015) British natural history painter and broadcaster
 Len Shackleton (1922–2000), English footballer
 Luke Shackleton (born 1984), Australian rules footballer
 Lydia Shackleton (1828–1914), Irish Botanic artist
 Megan Shackleton (born 1999), British Paralympic table tennis player
 Nicholas Shackleton (1937–2006), British geologist and climatologist
 Polly Shackleton (c. 1910–1997), American politician
 Robert Shackleton (1919–1986), British French-language philologist and librarian
 Robert Millner Shackleton (1909–2001), British field geologist specialising in East Africa
 Sam Shackleton, British dubstep music producer
 Shane Shackleton (born 1982), Australian rugby player
 Simon Shackleton, English musician, producer and DJ
 William Shackleton (1908–1971), English cricketer
 York Shackleton (born 1974), American filmmaker and snowboarder
 D. R. Shackleton Bailey (1917–2005), English scholar of Latin literature
 Richard Shackleton Pope (1793–1884), British architect